The 2020–21 Pro Basketball League (PBL) was the 94th season of the Pro Basketball League, the highest professional basketball league in the Belgium. The regular season was supposed to start in September 2020 but was delayed to 2 October 2020 due to new coronavirus restrictions. It is the last season as the PBL, as in the following season the multinational BNXT League commences.

It will be the first season after the 2019–20 season was ended prematurely due to the COVID-19 pandemic. 

BC Oostende won its 22nd national championship after beating Belfius Mons-Hainaut in the finals.

Teams

Stadiums and locations 

Note: Table lists in alphabetical order.

Personnel and kits

Managerial changes

Regular season

League table

Results

Playoffs

References

Pro Basketball League
1
Belgium
Basketball events postponed due to the COVID-19 pandemic